The 1969 Kansas Jayhawks football team represented the University of Kansas in the Big Eight Conference during the 1969 NCAA University Division football season. In their third season under head coach Pepper Rodgers, the Jayhawks compiled a 1–9 record (0–7 against conference opponents), finished in last place in the Big Eight Conference, and were outscored by their opponents by a combined total of 290 to 176. They played their home games at Memorial Stadium in Lawrence, Kansas.

Kansas tied Oklahoma for the 1968 Big Eight championship, the Jayhawks' most recent conference title as of 2022. The Jayhawks, who lost 15-14 to undefeated Penn State in the 1969 Orange Bowl, were hit hard by graduation going into 1969, including quarterback Bobby Douglass and defensive end John Zook, who were NFL starters (with the Chicago Bears and Atlanta Falcons, respectively) as rookies. 

Archrival Missouri wrapped up the Big Eight championship with a 69-21 rout at Lawrence in the last game played on natural grass at Memorial Stadium. As of 2022, that is the Tigers' most recent conference title. 

The team's statistical leaders included Phil Basler with 746 passing yards, John Riggins with 662 rushing yards and John Mosier with 339 receiving yards. Emery Hicks was the team captain.

Schedule

Roster

References

Kansas
Kansas Jayhawks football seasons
Kansas Jayhawks football